Nina Gunke (born 12 July 1955) is a Swedish actress. She has appeared in more than 40 films and television shows since 1975.

Selected filmography
 Hello Baby (1976)
 The Man from Majorca (1984)
 The Great Day on the Beach (1991)
 Lakki (1992)
 Jungle Jack (1993)
 All Things Fair (1995)
 Jungledyret Hugo 2 - den store filmhelt (1996)
 In Bed with Santa (1999)

References

External links

1955 births
Living people
20th-century Swedish actresses
21st-century Swedish actresses
Swedish film actresses
Swedish television actresses
People from Lidingö Municipality